Kehel may refer to:

Villages in Iran 
 Kehel, Ardabil, in Khalkhal County, Ardabil Province
 Kehel Dasht, in Ardabil Province

See also 
 Kohol (disambiguation)